"Beautiful Trauma" is a song by American singer Pink. She co-wrote the track with its producer Jack Antonoff. It was released through RCA Records on September 28, 2017, as the first promotional single from Pink's seventh studio album, Beautiful Trauma (2017). The song was released to American contemporary hit radio as the second official single of the album on November 21, 2017. It has reached number one on Danish, German, and Polish radio.

Release
Alongside the announcement of the track on Twitter, Pink explained her reasoning for the title of the album: "life is fucking traumatic. But it's also incredibly beautiful, too. There's a lot of beauty still and beautiful souls." The song was released on September 28, 2017, as a promotional single for her album, Beautiful Trauma. The song impacted BBC Radio 1 as an "A List" on November 10, 2017. The song released as the second official single of the album on November 21, 2017.

Composition
"Beautiful Trauma" is performed in the key of G major with a tempo of 96 beats per minute in common time. Pink's vocals span two octaves, from G3 to G5. It has been described as "oversized, emotional power-pop song".

Critical reception
Andrew Unterberger from Billboard described the song as "elegant and bloody, shimmering and grungy… its life affirming without being pandering", whilst also noting that it was the "perfect lead single" choice. Hayden Wright from Radio.com reviewed the song positively, stating, "it’s an epic, dramatic track with stylistic range and plenty of heart".

Music video

Two videos were released for the song. On October 12, 2017 a dance video featuring dancer and model Larsen Thompson and a company of male dancers was released, directed by Nick Florez and R. J. Durell, Pink's choreographers. On November 21, 2017, this was followed by an "official" music video featuring actor, producer, model, singer and dancer Channing Tatum. The video features Pink and Tatum as Fred and Ginger Hart. Throughout the video, Pink vacuums, irons a shirt and subsequently burns it, and burns a pie. The two then dance in drag, drink, and engage in role play with a second woman named Rhonda (portrayed by Nikki Tuazon). The music video was directed and choreographed by Florez and Durell. For the video, costume designer Kim Bowen won the Costume Designers Guild Award for Excellence in Short Form Design.

Live performances
Pink performed the song on Saturday Night Live on October 14, 2017, alongside "What About Us". She also performed the track on Good Morning America. On November 19, 2017, Pink performed "Beautiful Trauma" at the American Music Awards while suspended from a high wire off of a skyscraper. Pink also performed the song on the fourteenth series of The X Factor UK on December 3, 2017 alongside "What About Us".

Track listing
Digital download – The Remixes
"Beautiful Trauma" (Kat Krazy Remix) – 3:13
"Beautiful Trauma" (MOTi Remix) – 3:29
"Beautiful Trauma" (Nathan Jain Remix) – 2:33
"Beautiful Trauma" (E11even Remix) – 3:07

Charts

Weekly charts

Year-end charts

Certifications

See also
 List of number-one dance singles of 2018 (U.S.)
 List of number-one singles of 2018 (Poland)

References

2017 singles
2017 songs
American power pop songs
Songs about cross-dressing
Number-one singles in Poland
Pink (singer) songs
Songs written by Pink (singer)
Songs written by Jack Antonoff
Song recordings produced by Jack Antonoff
RCA Records singles